Red onion is a vegetable.

Red onion may also refer to:
Red Onion, Kansas, a community in Kansas
The Red Onion, a restaurant in Aspen, Colorado
Red Onion State Prison, a state prison in western Virginia